Walter Richard West Sr. (1912–1996, Southern Cheyenne), was a painter, sculptor, and educator. He led the Art Department at Bacone College from 1947 to 1970. He later taught at Haskell Institute for several years.  West is an enrolled member of the Cheyenne and Arapaho Tribes.

Early life and education
West was born on September 8, 1912, in a tipi near the Darlington Agency in Oklahoma. His Cheyenne name, Wapah Nahyah, means "Lightfooted Runner." His father was Lightfoot West. His mother was Rena Flying Coyote, also known as Emily Black Wolf, whose parents were Big Belly Woman and Thunder Bull. West's 

West attended Concho Indian Boarding School and Haskell Institute in Lawrence, Kansas. At that time, Haskell had grades 9-12 and served as a high school; he graduated in 1935. (It later gained status as a junior college and then as a four-year college.) One of his earliest artistic mentors was painter Carl Sweezy (1881–1953), Southern Arapaho.

From 1936 to 1938, West attended Bacone College in Muskogee, Oklahoma, where he earned an associate's degree. At Bacone, West studied under celebrated artist, Acee Blue Eagle (1907–1959, Muscogee). His classmates at Bacone College included Terry Saul and Oscar Howe. As a young man, West played football and worked in oil fields.

West enrolled at University of Oklahoma (OU), where he earned a BFA degree in 1941. He later returned for graduate work, earning an MFA degree in 1950. While at OU, he studied under Swedish-American artist Oscar Jacobson (1882–1996), who mentored the Kiowa Six, other Native American artists. West felt that Jacobson's active support of Native Americans helped him cope with the widespread racial prejudice that he encountered in the city of Norman.

In 1941 and 1942, West lived in Phoenix, Arizona, where he studied mural painting under Olle Nordmark (1890–1973), a Swedish-American artist and sculptor. West continued post-graduate studies at Northeastern State University, University of Tulsa, and Redlands College.

Marriage and family
In 1940, West married Maribelle McCrea. They had two sons together, W. Richard West Jr. and James Lee West. In 1970, he married his second wife, Rene Wagoner.

Teaching career
In 1941, West began his first teaching assignment at the Phoenix Indian School, serving primarily Navajo students. After the United States entered World War II, he joined the US Navy the next year and fought in Europe, serving from 1942 to postwar 1946. Upon his honorable discharge, West returned to teaching at the Phoenix Indian School.

He was hired at Bacone College in Muskogee, Oklahoma, where he became head of the art department and taught from 1947 to 1970. From 1970 to 1977, West taught art at Haskell Indian Junior College in Kansas. He influenced generations of Native American artists. His students included such successful artists as Joan Hill, Enoch Kelly Haney, Johnny Tiger Jr., Sharron Ahtone Harjo, Marlene Riding In-Mameah, and Virginia Stroud.

From 1979 to 1980, West served as professor emeritus at Bacone College.

Artwork
Dick West was a master of flat-style painting, that drew upon the pictorial and narrative aspects of Plains hide painting. Flat style painting frequently portrays tribal dances and histories. His works portrayed Cheyenne culture, as informed by his highly traditional upbringing.

A complete departure from that style was West's Indian Christ series, which were lush, allegorical oil paintings of New Testament stories with Native American figures, set in the Southern Plains. Through this series, West wanted to portray the universality of Jesus.

Although flat-style is what he is best known for, West also painted abstract and highly stylized works in oil, watercolor, tempera, and gouache. He illustrated four books and also sculpted in wood and metal.

Awards and honors
The Section of Painting and Sculpture commissioned West to paint a mural for the U.S. Post Office of Okemah, Oklahoma in 1941. He won two grand awards from the Philbrook Museum. In 1964, he won the Waite Phillips Outstanding Indian Artist Award from the Philbrook Museum of Art.

In 1962, the Eastern Baptist College awarded him an honorary doctorates in humane letters, as did the Baker University, in 1976. From 1979-80, West was a commissioner on the Indian Arts and Crafts Board.

Public collections
West's work can be found in the following public art collections:

Bacone College
Bureau of Indian Affairs
Denver Art Museum
Eastern Baptist College, St. David's, PA
Fred Jones Jr. Museum of Art
The George Gustav Heye Center
Gilcrease Museum
Indian Arts and Crafts Board, US Department of the Interior
Joslyn Art Museum
Koshare Indian Museum
Museum of Northern Arizona, Katherine Harvey Collection
Muskogee Art Guild, OK
National Gallery of Art
Philbrook Museum of Art
St. Augustine's Center, Chicago, IL
Seminole Public Library, OK
Southern Plains Indian Museum
University of Oklahoma, Library

Death
Dick West died on May 3, 1996.

Quote
[T]he Indian artist must be allowed freedom to absorb influences outside of his own art forms and see the promise of a new lane of expression that should keep the Indian's art the art form termed 'native Indian painting,' and I give my student every opportunity to execute it... I have always felt that the term abstraction has been a part of the Indian's artistic thinking longer than most European contemporary influences and perhaps in a [truer] form..." —Dick West, 1955

Notes

References
Lester, Patrick D. The Biographical Directory of Native American Painters. Norman and London: The Oklahoma University Press, 1995. .
Wyckoff, Lydia L., ed. Visions and voices : Native American painting from the Philbrook Museum of Art''. Tulsa, OK: Philbrook Museum of Art, 1996. .

External links
Walter Richard West, on AskArt with images
1970s KTUL sign-off: Indian sign language, Walter Richard "Dick" West performing "Lord's Prayer" using sign language, from Channel 8's nightly signoff in the 1970s via YouTube

1912 births
1996 deaths
People from Canadian County, Oklahoma
Cheyenne and Arapaho Tribes people
Native American painters
Painters from Oklahoma
Bacone College alumni
Bacone College faculty
University of Oklahoma alumni
Section of Painting and Sculpture artists